Lloyd William Criss Jr. (January 17, 1941 – May 10, 2020) was an American politician who served in the Texas House of Representatives from 1979 to 1991.

Criss was born in Galveston, Texas. He moved with his family to Texas City, Texas. Criss was a plumber and pipefitter and was involved with the labor union. Criss served on the La Marque, Texas City Council. He died on May 10, 2020, in Texas City, Texas at age 79.

References

1941 births
2020 deaths
People from Galveston, Texas
People from La Marque, Texas
People from Texas City, Texas
American plumbers
Texas city council members
Democratic Party members of the Texas House of Representatives